Ruben Fritzner Providence (born 7 July 2001) is a French professional footballer who plays as a winger or forward for Austrian Bundesliga club TSV Hartberg, on loan from Roma.

Career
In 2019, Providence joined the youth academy of Italian Serie A side Roma. In 2021, he was sent on loan to Club Brugge in Belgium. Before the second half of 2021–22, he was sent on loan to Portuguese club Estoril. 

In 2022, Providence was sent on loan to TSV Hartberg in Austria. On 2 October 2022, he debuted for TSV Hartberg during a 3–2 loss to Austria Klagenfurt.

References

External links
 

Living people
2001 births
French footballers
Association football forwards
Association football wingers
France youth international footballers
Austrian Football Bundesliga players
A.S. Roma players
Club Brugge KV players
G.D. Estoril Praia players
TSV Hartberg players
French expatriate footballers
French expatriate sportspeople in Austria
Expatriate footballers in Austria
French expatriate sportspeople in Belgium
Expatriate footballers in Belgium
French expatriate sportspeople in Italy
Expatriate footballers in Italy
French expatriate sportspeople in Portugal
Expatriate footballers in Portugal